"The Blinded Bird" is a 1916 poem written by English author and poet Thomas Hardy.

The poem was reportedly written as a protest against Vinkensport, a sort of singing competition between male finches. The poem decries the prior historical practice of blinding birds to improve their performance at the sport. For its last stanza Hardy borrows from the New Testament using themes found in 1 Cor. 13: 1-8.

References

External links
 The Blinded Bird at The Literature Network
 1 Corinthians 13:1-8 (King James Version) at BibleGateway.com

Poetry by Thomas Hardy
1916 poems
Fiction about animal cruelty